Mark James may refer to:
 Mark James (golfer) (born 1953), English golfer
 Mark James (rower), New Zealand rower
 Mark James (songwriter) (born 1940), American songwriter
 Mark Andrew James, American conductor and oboist
 Mark James, a fictional character in the Lorien Legacies series
 Marc St. James, a fictional character in  Ugly Betty and web-series Mode After Hours
 Mark James Kilroy (1968–1989), American student killed in a human sacrifice ritual in Mexico
 Mark Howard James, aka The 45 King, hip hop producer
 Mark James (British cleric) (1845-1898), Canon of Bermuda Cathedral

See also